Sacramento Gold may refer to:

 Sacramento Gold (1976–1980)
 Sacramento Gold FC, since 2009